The Summer Stakes is a Thoroughbred horse race run annually in mid-September at Woodbine Racetrack in Toronto, Ontario, Canada. Contested on turf over a distance of 1 mile (8 furlongs), it is open to two-year-old horses. It became a Grade II in 1999 but in 2006 was downgraded to a Grade III status. In 2012, it returned to Grade II status. In 2018, the Jockey Club of Canada moved it to Grade I status.

Part of the Breeders' Cup Challenge series, the winner of the Summer Stakes automatically qualifies for the Breeders' Cup Juvenile Turf.

Inaugurated in 1953 at Fort Erie Racetrack as a sprint race on dirt, the Summer Stakes was moved to the turf in 1962. Since inception it has been run at various distances:
 5 furlongs : 1953–1956 on dirt at Fort Erie Racetrack
 5.5 furlongs : 1957–1960, 1961 on dirt at Fort Erie Racetrack
 8 furlongs (1 mile) : 1962–1984 on turf at Fort Erie Racetrack, since 1985 on turf at Woodbine Racetrack

The race was run in two divisions in 1958, 1967, and 1969.

Records
Speed  record: 
 1:34.38 – Good Samaritan (2016)

Most wins by an owner:
 8 – Sam-Son Farm (1980, 1984, 1985, 1986, 1987, 1989, 1990, 1993)

Most wins by a jockey:
 6 – Robin Platts (1975, 1976, 1981, 1982, 1983, 1988)

Most wins by a trainer:
 8 – James E. Day (1980, 1984, 1985, 1986, 1987, 1989, 1990, 1993)

Winners

* In 1992, Desert Waves finished first but was disqualified and set back to sixth.

See also

 List of Canadian flat horse races

References

 The Summer Stakes at Pedigree Query

Grade 1 stakes races in Canada
Turf races in Canada
Flat horse races for two-year-olds
Breeders' Cup Challenge series
Recurring sporting events established in 1953
Woodbine Racetrack
1953 establishments in Ontario